Secret Life of Machines is the debut studio album by the rock band Doldrums, released on October 31, 1995 by VHF Records.

Track listing

Personnel 
Adapted from Secret Life of Machines liner notes.

Doldrums
 Justin Chearno – guitar, recording
 Bill Kellum – bass guitar, recording
 Matt Kellum – drums, recording

Additional musicians
 Andrew Giles – guitar (5)
Production and additional personnel
 Vicki Ellison – photography

Release history

References

External links 
 

1995 debut albums
Doldrums (band) albums
VHF Records albums